Bembidion tibiale is a species of ground beetle native to Europe.

The ground beetle is usually 5.5-6.5mm, long, black, with strong metallic blue or green reflections.

References

tibiale
Beetles described in 1812
Beetles of Europe